The Burt County Courthouse is a historic building in Tekamah, Nebraska, and the courthouse for Burt County, Nebraska. It was built in 1916-1917 to replace the old 1878 courthouse. It was designed in the Beaux Arts style by Rose & Peterson. It has been listed on the National Register of Historic Places since January 10, 1990.

References

National Register of Historic Places in Burt County, Nebraska
Beaux-Arts architecture in Nebraska
Government buildings completed in 1916